GTP-binding protein GEM is a protein that in humans is encoded by the GEM gene.

The protein encoded by this gene belongs to the RAD/GEM family of GTP-binding proteins. It is associated with the inner face of the plasma membrane and could play a role as a regulatory protein in receptor-mediated signal transduction. Alternative splicing occurs at this locus  and two transcript variants encoding the same protein have been identified.

References

Further reading